Harsh Mayar is an Indian actor working in Hindi Bollywood films. He won the National Film Award for Best Child Artist for his work in 2011 film I Am Kalam.

I Am Kalam
Mayar started his career in 2005 when he was only eight years old. He joined Shri Ram Center in Delhi with the support of his uncle Sunil Kumar because his parents were not able to afford the fee of his acting classes. During that time, he played 5–6 stage shows. Afterwards he gave 180 auditions for singing, dancing and acting. He was selected for Chillar Party, but he did not match the role and decided not to work for the film because he had broken his right hand while playing. 
After a few months when he had recovered, he got a call for an audition. His parents convinced him for the audition and he was then selected for the film I Am Kalam. The film was shot in Rajasthan in 2009 and he worked with debuting director Nila Madhab Panda, with veteran actor Gulshan Grover and comic actor Pitobash Tripathy. I Am Kalam released on 5 August 2011. Mayar won many international awards for his performance in I Am Kalam. He also won the 58th National Film Award for the best child artist. 
His next film Jalpari: The Desert Mermaid released in 2012. He has worked in Chaarfutiya Chhokare (1 August 2014) with Soha Ali Khan, in a Bollywood thriller film, written and directed by Manish Harishankar  The latest film of Harsh was Hichki, with Rani Mukerji.

Musical theatre 
Mayar was in the Hindi musical Paighamber, directed by Vikas Dwivedi, with Tom Alter and Amit Behl in lead roles. The play is inspired by the literary classic The Prophet , by Kahlil Gibran, and incorporates folk music of Chhattisgarh and Haryana and the Karma dance form of Chhattisgarh, along with live music and singing.

Television
Harsh appeared as lead in DD National's - Aadha Full as Adrak. He started his television career from Channel V India crime series Gumrah: End of Innocence in 2014. After that he appeared in an episode of &TV crime show Tujhse Naaraz Nahin Zindagi in 2015.

Short film 
Mayar worked as lead in a student film project, Untitled - The Words Left Unsaid, directed by Sachin Aggarwal. It is an 8-minute short film in which Harsh is Nitin, is a 15-year-old schooboy who is alone in his home and write letters to his mother. The film was shot in the village of Makrauli village in the Rohtak District.

Awards

National film awards
Winner
 2010: Best Child Actor - I Am Kalam
2011: Best Child Actor In Bhagat Singh Bravery Award

Nominated 
2012: Screen Award - I Am Kalam
2022: Filmfare OTT Awards - Best supporting Actor (Comedy)

International awards
Winner
2011: River Rock Award Best Actor in Silent River Film Festival, California -I Am Kalam
2011: Special Mention for Best Actor in International Children's Film Festival India, Heydrabad - I Am Kalam
2010: Best Actor in Minsk International Film Festival "Listapad"

Filmography

References

External links
 

Indian male film actors
21st-century Indian male child actors
Living people
1998 births
Male actors in Hindi cinema
Best Child Artist National Film Award winners